Eden Roc may refer to:
 Hôtel du Cap-Eden Roc at Antibes on the French Riviera
 Eden Roc, Hawaii
 Eden Roc (album), a 1999 music album by the Italian pianist Ludovico Einaudi
 Eden Roc Miami Beach Hotel, Florida